is the head temple of the Omuro school of the Shingon Sect of Buddhism. Located in western Kyoto, Japan, it was first founded in AD 888 by Emperor Uda, and was later reconstructed in the 17th century. It is part of the Historic Monuments of Ancient Kyoto, a UNESCO World Heritage Site.

History
Ninna-ji was founded in the early Heian period. In 886, Emperor Kōkō ordered the construction of the Nishiyama Goganji Temple to bless the nation and propagate Buddhist teachings, but he did not live to see its completion. Emperor Uda saw the construction to its completion in 888 and named it "Ninna" after the regnal year of the late Emperor Kōkō's reign.  From 888 to 1869 it was traditional for reigning Emperors to send a son to the temple to take over as head priest when a vacancy arose.

After retiring from his throne, Emperor Uda became the first Monzeki, or aristocratic priest, of Ninna-ji. From then on until the end of the Edo period, the temple saw a succession of head priests of imperial lineage.

In 1467, the temple was destroyed by fire and fighting in the Ōnin War. It was rebuilt roughly 150 year later, thanks to the eldest son of Emperor Go-Yōzei, Kakushin Hosshinnō, who enlisted the help of Tokugawa Iemitsu, the third shōgun of the Tokugawa shogunate. The resurrection coincided with the rebuilding of the Imperial Palace in Kyoto and thus received imperial funding.

The tradition of having aristocratic or persons of imperial lineage serve as chief of the temple ended with the 30th Monzeki, Junnin Hosshinnō in the late Edo period.

Most of the surviving buildings date from the 17th century, and include a five-story pagoda and an orchard of late blooming dwarf cherry trees called the Omuro cherry trees that would grow to around 2–3 meters (10 feet) in height.  The temple itself features some beautifully painted screen walls, and a beautiful walled garden.

Buildings 
National Treasure of Japan
Golden Hall
Important Cultural Property of Japan
Pagoda
Kyōzō
Niōmon
Chūmon
Shōrō
Kannon-dō
Miei-dō
Chūmon of Miei-dō
Kyūsho-myōjin
Omotemon of Honbō
Ryōkaku-tei
Hitō-tei
Other
Chokushimon
Shinden
Reimeiden
Kuro Shoin
Shiro Shoin

See also
 List of Buddhist temples in Kyoto
 List of National Treasures of Japan (temples)
 List of National Treasures of Japan (ancient documents)
List of National Treasures of Japan (paintings)
List of National Treasures of Japan (sculptures)
List of National Treasures of Japan (crafts-others)
List of National Treasures of Japan (writings)
Thirteen Buddhist Sites of Kyoto
 For an explanation of terms concerning Japanese Buddhism, Japanese Buddhist art, and Japanese Buddhist temple architecture, see the Glossary of Japanese Buddhism.

External links 
 Ninna-ji official website
 Photos of Ninna-ji

References

Buddhist temples in Kyoto
Gardens in Kyoto Prefecture
Religious organizations established in the 9th century
World Heritage Sites in Japan
National Treasures of Japan
Historic Sites of Japan
Important Cultural Properties of Japan
9th-century establishments in Japan
9th-century Buddhist temples
Monzeki
Religious buildings and structures completed in 888